Eastland Air was an airline based in Toowoomba, Queensland, Australia. The airline started passenger operations in 1991 and ceased in 2003.

Destinations

 Queensland
 Brisbane
 Cunnamulla
 St George
 Thargomindah
 Toowoomba
 New South Wales
 Moree

Fleet
At various stages during its time in operation, Eastland Air operated the following aircraft types;

Beech 200 Super King Air
Beech C90 King Air
de Havilland DHC-6-200 Twin Otter
Piper PA-31
Fairchild SA-227 Metroliner

Accidents and incidents
 On 27 November 2001, a Beech C90 King Air operated by Eastland Air crashed after take-off at Toowoomba Aerodrome killing the pilot and three members of the Queensland government's mental health team.

Code data
IATA Code: DK
ICAO Code: ELA

See also
List of defunct airlines of Australia
 Aviation in Australia

References

External links
Eastland Air Photos
History of an Eastland Air SA-227 Metro

Defunct airlines of Australia